De la Cierva (Spanish, 'of the deer') is a surname. Notable people with the surname include:

 Juan de la Cierva (1895–1936), Spanish civil engineer, pilot and aeronautical engineer
 Ricardo de la Cierva (1926–2015), Spanish historian and politician

Spanish-language surnames